T. Manavalan was an Indian politician and former Member of the Legislative Assembly of Tamil Nadu. He was elected to the Tamil Nadu legislative assembly from Gudiyatham constituency as an Indian National Congress candidate in 1957, and 1962 elections.

References 

Members of the Tamil Nadu Legislative Assembly
Year of birth missing
Possibly living people
Indian National Congress politicians from Tamil Nadu